Habertürk TV is a Turkish nationwide TV channel established in 2001 by Turkish journalist Ufuk Güldemir. It is owned by the Ciner Media Group (since 2007). In 2009 Ciner created the Habertürk newspaper, drawing on Habertürk TV's brand.

In June 2013, Habertürk TV's relative lack of coverage of the 2013–14 protests in Turkey saw hundreds of protestors gather in front of its head office in Istanbul.

References

External links 

Television stations in Turkey
Television channels and stations established in 2001
Ciner Media Group
24-hour television news channels in Turkey
Mass media in Istanbul